The MPI MP8AC-3 is a light-weight diesel locomotive built by the MotivePower division of Wabtec. It was designed from scratch as a work train engine for the New York City Subway system, where it is designated the R156.

Description 
It joins a fleet of 62 diesel-electric work locomotives on the system. Third rail power is not used because the third rail is normally turned off at work sites for safety reasons. Instead, the R156 is powered by a 6-cylinder, 800 horsepower Cummins QSK 23 diesel engine. A separate, smaller John Deere Diesel drives a generator to provide auxiliary power and to heat the main engine and keep batteries charged when the main engine is not running. Trucks are supplied by Kawasaki, which provides the same wheel and traction sets for the R160 subway cars. The traction motors are Siemens' SITRAC AC motors (the same ones on R160Bs 8843–9102). The R156 locomotives have provisions for the future installation of communications-based train control (CBTC) equipment, which were expected to be installed by June 2017.

The MTA ordered 28 units in 2006. After some difficulty with the initial prototype, the first unit, numbered OL912, was delivered on May 1, 2012.

References

MPI locomotives
New York City Subway
Diesel-electric locomotives of the United States
EPA_Tier_3-compliant_locomotives_of_the_United_States
Standard gauge locomotives of the United States
Railway locomotives introduced in 2012